The Lieutenant is a rock opera with book, music and lyrics by Gene Curty, Nitra Scharfman and Chuck Strand. The musical concerns the court martial of Lieutenant William Calley during the Vietnam War and ran on Broadway in 1975.

Production
The original production of The Lieutenant, directed by William Martin and choreographed by Dennis Dennehy opened on Broadway at the Lyceum Theatre on March 9, 1975 and closed on March 16, 1975 after nine performances and seven previews. The cast featured Eddie Mekka and was produced by Joseph S. Kutrzeba and Spofford J. Beadle.

The Lieutenant was nominated for four Tony Awards including Best Musical, Tony Award for Best Book of a Musical, Tony Award for Best Original Score and Best Actor in a Musical.

The Lieutenant was originally produced by Queens Playhouse, (Flushing Meadows, New York) in 1974 by Joseph S. Kutrzeba, who started the Playhouse. Alan Eichler was the press representative.

Producer and Holocaust survivor Joseph Kutrzeba said of the reason he decided to produce The Lieutenant was "The show meant a lot to  me on human values. I think the theme is one of cardinal importance to our times: The concept of obedience versus exercising one's own conscience." The Philadelphia Inquirer September 3, 1974 

In 1994 an adaptation of The Lieutenant  was performed under the title "...One of the Good Guys" by Israeli actor Meir Vardi and David Bolander at the Sanford Meisner Theatre in New York City.

A 2018 revival of the show is in pre-production.

Overview

The show poses the question: Where does the guilt lie for the My Lai massacre of civilians in 1968 Vietnam? Does it reside solely in the person of The Lieutenant, who gave the order to "waste them"? Or perhaps in the larger military itself, where wars are planned, body counts are calculated, and inconvenient casualties are sometimes scrubbed from the record? Or just maybe the seeds for deeds like My Lai are latent in the very fabric of the human race, and once in a while the perfect storm of events allows for something terrible like this to happen?

The use of music follows the approach of Brecht, whereby the songs comment on themes and issues of the play.

In August 2016, Miles Kreuger, president of The Institute for the American Musical in Los Angeles, California, accepted the script, score, libretto, reviews and playbill of The Lieutenant into their archives.

Original Broadway cast 
 Eddie Mekka starred as The Lieutenant.
 Steven Boockvor – Soldier in "C" Company
 Gene Curty – Judge, OCS Sergeant
 Chet D'Elia –  First General
 Gordon Grody –  Defense Attorney
 Walt Hunter –  Captain
 Clark James – Soldier in "C" Company
 Dan Kruger – Soldier in "C" Company
 James "Jim" Litten –  Sergeant, Soldier  "C" Company, Clergyman and First Reporter
 Donald Rayson McGrath –  Chaplain and First Congressman
 Jim-Patrick McMahon – Soldier in "C" Company
 Eugene Moose –  Second General
 Joel Powers – Recruiting Sergeant, Senator
 Joseph Pugliese – Soldier in "C" Company
 Burt Rodriguez – Soldier in "C" Company, Second Congressman, Prosecutor
 Alan K. Siegel – New Recruit
 Jo Speros – Sole female, Third Reporter
 Danny Taylor – Third General
 Tom Tofel – G.I., Second Reporter, Soldier in "C" Company

Musicians
Mark Cianfrani on Lead Guitar
 John Angelori on Rhythm Guitar
 Alan Bowin on Organ
 Joe DiCarlo on Drums
 James Marino on Bass Guitar
 Chuck Strand on Piano.

Recording
The cast album was recorded in 1975 but never officially released.

Songs
The Indictment – Lieutenant and Judge 
Join the Army – Lieutenant, Recruiting Sergeant and Recruits 
Look for the Men With Potential – Generals 
Kill – OCS Sergeant 
I Don't Want to Go Over to Vietnam – Lieutenant and "C" Company 
Eulogy – Chaplain 
At 0700 Tomorrow – Captain and "C" Company
Massacre – Captain, Lieutenant, "C" Company and Vietnamese 
Something's Gone Wrong – Captain and Lieutenant 
Twenty-Eight – Generals, Captain and Lieutenant 
Let's Believe in the Captain – Generals 
Final Report – First General 
I Will Make Things Happen – G.I.
He Wants to Put the Army in Jail – Senator, 1st & 2nd Congressmen and Clergyman 
There's No Other Solution – Generals 
I'm Going Home – Lieutenant and "C" Company 
We've Chosen You, Lieutenant – Generals 
The Star of This War – Reporters and Lieutenant 
On Trial for My Life – Lieutenant 
The Conscience of a Nation – Prosecutor
Damned No Matter How He Turned – Defense Attorney 
On Trial for My Life (Reprise) – Lieutenant 
The Verdict – Judge and Jurors 
Finale – New Recruit, Recruiting Sergeant and Company

Critical response
The musical was described by Clive Barnes in his New York Times review as "extremely well staged" a "rock opera", and "it works very well indeed".

He also mentioned in The Morning News that the Lieutenant is "attractive and supportive" and there is "never a dull moment" 

Ernest Leogrande of the New York News Service felt that "they have two of the essentials for any musical show: telling lyrics and strong melodies".

The Long Island Press said "If you never see another show, you must see this one"

Awards and nominations

Original Broadway production

References

External links
 Internet Broadway Database
 Mental Floss Musicals Featuring US Military
  Musicals 101.com
 New York Magazine - March 10, 1975 Listing
Broadway Musicals, 1943-2004, John Stewart, McFarland, 2006,  The Lieutenant
 Show Music on Record, Jack Raymond Digital ID loc.natlib.smor.19750309
 Central Opera Service Bulletin, Volume 22, Number 2, page 69
 [Hischack, Thomas S. The Lieutenant Broadway Plays and Musicals Descriptions and Essential Facts of more than 14,000 Shows Through 2007'', Thomas S. McFarland, 2009, p. 256]
 https://www.newspapers.com/image/38333151/
 29th Annual Tony Awards, 1975 https://www.youtube.com/watch?v=WkrcCpJZxng
 Library of Congress - https://www.loc.gov/item/smor.19750309
 "Shirley I Jest" by Cindy Williams page 98

Broadway musicals
1975 musicals
Vietnam War in popular culture